Behind Closed Doors is an album by Norwegian singer-songwriter Maria Solheim, released in 2002 by Kirkelig Kulturverksted (FXCD 253).

Track listing 
(All lyrics and compositions by Maria Solheim)
 Two Minutes and Ten Hours
 Kingdom
 Hiding Place
 It's Not a Matter Of
 Beauty Queen
 Train Under Water
 The Man Who Left His Past
 Richard
 You Want to Buy It Instead
 Behind Closed Doors
 Late at Night

Musicians
Vocals and guitars: Maria Solheim
Guitars, Pedalsteel: Kjetil Steensnæs
Fender Rhodes, vocals, Wurlitzer, Hammond: David Wallumrød
Drums and Percussion: Torstein Lofthus
Bass, Fender bass: Tor Egil Kreken
Keyboards: Bengt Egil Hanssen

Notes 
Producer: Bengt Egil Hanssen
Photo: Elisabeth Sperre Alnes
AD photo, styling: Iram Haq
Cover design: Camilla Skår Sletten
Recorded at Lydlab a/s by George Tanderø
Mixed at Lydlab a/s by Ulf W. Ø. Holand
Mastered at Cutting Room Studios, Stockholm by Björn Engelmann

The song "Train under water" has been dedicated to SOS Children's Villages Norway. All income of this song will be given in full to the organisation.

Trivia 
Richard, the eighth track on the album, has appeared in the anime BECK: Mongolian Chop Squad.

References 

Maria Solheim albums
2002 albums